Bruce Allen Davison (born June 28, 1946) is an American actor and director. Davison is well known for his starring role as Willard Stiles in the cult horror film Willard (1971) and his Academy Award-nominated and Golden Globe-winning performance in Longtime Companion (1989), and as Thomas Semmes in the HBO original movie Vendetta. He featured in the X-Men film franchise – through X-Men (2000) and X2 (2003) – as antagonist Senator Robert Kelly.

In the 2010s, Davison appeared in Fred Schepisi's Words and Pictures (2013), had a recurring role on The Fosters (2015–2016) and shares the screen with Miles Teller and Anna Kendrick in Get a Job (2016).

Early life
Davison was born in 1946 in Philadelphia, Pennsylvania. His parents divorced when he was three years old. He was raised by his mother and spent weekends with his father.

He graduated in 1964 from Marple Newtown Senior High School, entered Penn State as an art major, and then stumbled into acting when he accompanied a friend to an audition. He attended New York University's acting program, graduating in 1969.

Career

Davison made his Broadway debut in Tiger at the Gates in 1968. He also appeared as John Merrick in The Elephant Man, and starred in The Glass Menagerie with Jessica Tandy. Davison was one of a quartet of newcomers, including Barbara Hershey, Richard Thomas, and Catherine Burns when he made his film debut in Last Summer in 1969. In 1970, he played opposite Kim Darby in the film about peaceful student protest and its violent outcome The Strawberry Statement. A year later he portrayed the title role in the 1971 version of Willard, the first of two, as of the year 2015, to have been based on the novel Ratman's Notebooks. He also appeared in Ulzana's Raid, Peege, Mame, Mother, Jugs & Speed, Short Eyes, The Lathe of Heaven and Six Degrees of Separation.

Davison was an uncredited extra in Steven Spielberg's Close Encounters of the Third Kind (1977). He recalled, "Steven Spielberg was a great friend, although I never got to work with him, except for playing an extra in Close Encounters of the Third Kind because we were friends. I got off the mothership as one of the pilots."

In 1978, Davison appeared as Dean Torrence with Richard Hatch in the made-for-TV biopic Deadman's Curve (the story of 1960s pop duo Jan & Dean). The same year, he played the title role in the TV movie adaptation Summer Of My German Soldier.

In 1981, he had the lead role in The Wave based on real events, starring as a history teacher who had conducted an experiment in Nazi philosophy on his own students.

Davison also starred in Tales from the Darkside (Season 1, Episode 8) and played the role of the father in the short-lived Harry and the Hendersons TV series.

In 1983, Davison was cast by Joseph Papp in the Public Theater/New York Shakespeare Festival production of King Richard III. Additional Off-Broadway credits include Love Letters, The Cocktail Hour and Paula Vogel's Pulitzer Prize-winning play How I Learned to Drive. He also played the role of Ruby in the 1985 comedy Spies Like Us, starring Dan Aykroyd and Chevy Chase.

In 1990, he portrayed a homosexual man whose lover is dying of AIDS in Longtime Companion. The role earned Davison a nomination for the Academy Award for Best Supporting Actor and a Golden Globe Award for Best Supporting Actor - Motion Picture. He concluded his Golden Globe acceptance speech with the hope that humankind would devote as much effort to the war on AIDS as its wars against each other. Davison appeared in other movies addressing AIDS: In 1995's The Cure, he portrayed a physician sought by a young boy with AIDS in search of medical help. In 1996, Davison appeared in the film It's My Party, which chronicled the true events of a man dying with AIDS who decides to hold a farewell party for family and friends before taking his own life. Davison's website states he is a spokesperson for many AIDS-related groups and is a board member of the industry AIDS organization Hollywood Supports.

In Los Angeles, Davison has appeared on stage in Streamers and The Normal Heart, winning the Los Angeles Drama Critics Circle Award and Drama-Logue Award for his performances. Other theatre credits include The Caine Mutiny Court Martial (directed by Henry Fonda) and a stage adaptation of To Kill a Mockingbird.

Davison had roles in Runaway Jury, Apt Pupil, and his role in the X-Men movie franchise as Senator Robert Kelly in the first film and a shapeshifting impostor in X2. He was the fanatical Reverend Samuel Parris in Arthur Miller's screen adaptation of his play The Crucible. Davison also portrayed a rich philanthropist in the movie Christmas Angel.  Davison's many television credits include Hunter (in which he was a semi-regular for at least one season), Marcus Welby, M.D., Love, American Style, The Waltons, Lou Grant, Murder, She Wrote, Designing Women, Seinfeld, Chicago Hope, Law & Order: Special Victims Unit, V: The Series, Star Trek: Voyager, Star Trek: Enterprise, Battlestar Galactica, Lost, CSI: Miami, Supernatural, Ghost Whisperer, Castle, Hawaii Five-0, the Stephen King mini-series Kingdom Hospital, and a recurring role on The Practice. He played Mark Davis, a therapist who was a love interest for Cybill Shepherd's character in a Season 1 episode ("Look Who's Stalking") of her sitcom Cybill. Davison also had the recurring role of defense attorney Doug Hellman in Close to Home.

In 2001, Davison directed the TV film Off Season, which starred Sherilyn Fenn, Rory Culkin, Hume Cronyn and Adam Arkin. In 2007, Davison returned to the big screen as the father of Eric O'Neill in Breach. Also in that year, Davison was cast in the role of Charles Graiman, a protege of Wilton Knight who was the creator of the Knight Industries Three Thousand, in NBC's revival of the television series Knight Rider.

Davison also played the role of Dr. Silberman, the psychiatrist who once tormented Sarah Connor, in the seventh episode of Terminator: The Sarah Connor Chronicles. He portrayed Nick Anderson (a secret Santa Claus) in the TV movie Christmas Angel in 2009. In May 2010, Davison was cast to portray art dealer Wilhelm Van Schlagel for several episodes on ABC's General Hospital to begin airing in July 2010.

In 2010, he starred in the TV movie Titanic II. In 2011, he starred as Police Chief Kirkhoven in the movie Munger Road, and appeared in the Christmas movie 3 Holiday Tails. In 2012, he appeared in Rob Zombie's The Lords of Salem. In addition, he played Secretary of State William H. Seward in the movie Saving Lincoln.

He played the role of Rear Admiral Arthur Shepard, Lieutenant Grace Shepard's father, in the short-stint TV series Last Resort.

In 2016, Davison starred as Dr. Stanley Cole in the comedy/fantasy Abnormal Attraction.

Personal life
Davison has been married three times and has two children.  He was once engaged to actress Karen Austin and was married to actress Jess Walton in 1972 but the marriage was annulled in 1973. He has a son, Ethan, born in 1996, from his marriage to actress Lisa Pelikan. They were married in 1986 and divorced in 2006. Davison and Michele Correy married on April 30, 2006. They have a daughter who was born in 2006. They live in Los Angeles, California.

Filmography

Film

Television

References

External links

1946 births
20th-century American male actors
21st-century American male actors
American male film actors
American male stage actors
American male television actors
American male voice actors
Best Supporting Actor Golden Globe (film) winners
Independent Spirit Award for Best Supporting Male winners
Living people
Male actors from Philadelphia
Penn State College of Arts and Architecture alumni
Tisch School of the Arts alumni
Volpi Cup winners